Jean-Baptiste Akra Akassou (born November 5, 1985 in Songon) is an Ivorian professional footballer who currently plays for Anagennisi Karditsa.His weight is 73kg.

Honours

Club
Muangthong United
 Thailand Division 2 League Champions (1) : 2007

Niki Volos
 Football League (Greece) Champions (1) : 2013–14

References

External links
 

1985 births
Living people
Footballers from Abidjan
Ivorian footballers
Association football defenders
Stade d'Abidjan players
Jean-Baptiste Akassou
Jean-Baptiste Akassou
Budapest Honvéd FC players
Budapest Honvéd FC II players
Pécsi MFC players
Niki Volos F.C. players
Apollon Pontou FC players
Anagennisi Karditsa F.C. players
Ligue 1 players
Ivorian expatriate footballers
Jean-Baptiste Akassou
Ivorian expatriate sportspeople in Thailand
Expatriate footballers in Thailand
Nemzeti Bajnokság I players
Ivorian expatriate sportspeople in Hungary
Expatriate footballers in Hungary
Football League (Greece) players
Ivorian expatriate sportspeople in Greece
Expatriate footballers in Greece